Van der Kemp is a Dutch surname. Notable people with the surname include:

François Adriaan van der Kemp (1752–1829), member of the Dutch Patriots
Johannes van der Kemp (1747–1811), Dutch missionary
John Jacob Vanderkemp (1783–1855), Philadelphia business leader
Ronald van der Kemp (born 1964), Dutch fashion designer

Dutch-language surnames